HUV may refer to:
 Holbeck Urban Village, West Yorkshire, England
 Hypocomplementemic urticarial vasculitis syndrome
 San Mateo Del Mar Huave language, spoken in Mexico